The Club Deportivo de Fútbol Zitácuaro, commonly known as Zitácuaro, is a Mexican football club based in Zitácuaro. The club was founded in 1995, and currently plays in the Serie B of Liga Premier.

History
The team was formed in 1995, being registered in the Third Division. In its first year the team won the category championship and promotion to the Second Division.

In the summer of 2001 the team was champion of the Second Division after defeating Cihuatlán. Later the team got its promotion to Primera División A after defeating Halcones de Querétaro in a promotion play-off. During that time the team was known as Potros Zitácuaro and was owned by Grupo Pegaso, making it a reserve team for Atlante F.C. so it had players like Federico Vilar and Luis Gabriel Rey. In 2002 the team was moved to Mexico City and renamed Potros DF, this due to administrative issues of the club's owner group.

Later the team was revived in the Third Division, in 2013 the team got its promotion to Liga de Nuevos Talentos. In 2015 this team disappeared due to poor sports results. In 2017 the team returned to compete in Serie B de México, but was renamed Atlético Zitácuaro. However, the team only participated in the 2017–18 season.

In 2019 the team competed again, but from that year it took the name Club Deportivo de Fútbol Zitácuaro, in 2021 the team paused its participation due to financial problems derived from COVID-19. In 2022 the team returned to compete.

Players

Current squad

Reserve teams
Deportivo Zitácuaro (Liga TDP)
Reserve team that plays in the Liga TDP in the fourth level of the Mexican league system.

References

External links 

Association football clubs established in 1995
Football clubs in Michoacán
1995 establishments in Mexico
Liga Premier de México